Champions of the World is a cricket based quiz show telecast on ESPN and Star Cricket. This was a contest aimed at and exclusive to college students below the age of 25. The quiz endeavored to test the cricket quotient of students across the country. It was hosted by renowned commentator Harsha Bhogle.

Format

Season One
24 college teams from all over India were selected based on their performance in written qualifiers. These were held in Bangalore, Mumbai, Kolkata and Delhi. 3 colleges contested each televised episode and the winner proceeded to the semi finals. The remaining 2 teams were eliminated. Winner of each semi final proceeded to take part in a best-of-three final. The winners of season one were BMS College of Engineering from Bangalore.

Season Two
18 college teams from all over India were selected based on their performance in written qualifiers. 3 colleges contested each televised episode and the winner and the runner up proceeded to the second round. The 2 highest scoring winners proceeded to the finals. The 2 lowest scoring winners along with the highest scoring loser took part in the eliminator. The winners of season two were Acharya Prafulla Chandra College from Kolkata who won a thrilling final by 1 point, beating Defending Champions BMS College of Engineering, Bangalore.

Episode Format
The show consisted of three rounds. The names were based on terms used in One Day International - Powerplay, middle overs and slog overs.

Results

Sponsors
Season one was sponsored by Appy Fizz, a product by Parle Agro.

External links
 Episode 1
 Episode 2

References

Indian game shows
2007 Indian television series debuts
2008 Indian television series endings
Cricket on television
Indian sports television series
Television game shows with incorrect disambiguation